Dirty Secrets of the Black Hand is a supplement  published by White Wolf Publishing in 1994 for the modern-day horror role-playing game Vampire: The Masquerade.

Contents
Dirty Secrets of the Black Hand, by Steven C. Brown, explores the Black Hand, the oldest vampire covenant, and its history and goals. The book also details new spells and powers.

Reception
In the November 1995 edition of Dragon (Issue #223), Rick Swan commented, "Grisly and humorless, Black Hand is the role-playing equivalent of a splatter movie — hard-core players should take that as a recommendation."

Reviews
Casus Belli V1 #93 (Apr 1996)

References

External links
Guide du Rôliste Galactique

Role-playing game books
Role-playing game supplements introduced in 1994
Vampire: The Masquerade